Begonia furfuracea is a species of plant in the family Begoniaceae. It is found in Cameroon and Equatorial Guinea. Its natural habitat is subtropical or tropical moist lowland forests. It is threatened by habitat loss.

References

furfuracea
Taxonomy articles created by Polbot
Taxa named by Joseph Dalton Hooker
Plants described in 1871